Osvald Harjo (30 September 1910 – 20 April 1993) was a Norwegian resistance member during World War II, and a prisoner in Soviet Gulag camps for more than a decade.

After being arrested and tortured by the Gestapo in 1942, he managed to escape from custody and fled into the Soviet Union. Here, he was accused of being a German spy, and convicted to 15 years forced labour. He was released in 1955, after pressure from the Norwegian Prime Minister during a visit in Moscow.
Paul Engstad wrote Harjo's memoir book  in 1956.

References

1910 births
1993 deaths
People from Sør-Varanger
Norwegian resistance members
Norwegian memoirists
Norwegian torture victims
Norwegian escapees
Escapees from German detention
People convicted of spying
Foreign Gulag detainees
Norwegian people imprisoned abroad
20th-century Norwegian writers
20th-century memoirists